The Seraphim Medal is a royal medal of Sweden. Established in 1748, it is awarded by the King of Sweden for service that benefits society or service of a humanitarian nature.

Appearance
The  Seraphim Medal is a gold medal of the 8th size. The obverse of the medal bears the effigy of King Frederick I with the inscription above FREDERICUS D.G. REX SUECIAE. The reverse of the medal bears these words in the centre: ORDO EQ SERAPHIN · RESTAURATUS NATALI REGIS LXXIII · (Order of the Seraphim restored on the seventy-third birthday of the King). Surrounding all of this is the collar of the Order of the Seraphim. Circumscribing the collar is the inscription PROCERES CUM REGE NECTIT 1748 (It unites the Foremost with the Prince).

Recipients
Since 1973, the medal has only been awarded to the following fifteen people:
Britta Holmström, 1973
Jacob Wallenberg, 1975
Sven Romanus, 1980
Gösta Wallin, 1980
Sven Edling, 1984
Olof Rydbeck, 1987
Henry Montgomery, 1998
Carl Axel Petri, 1998
Peter Wallenberg, 2000
Carl-Gustaf Andrén, 2002
Hans Blix, 2004
Sture Linnér, 2008
Herbert Blomstedt, 2012
Stig Strömholm, 2012
Hédi Fried, 2019

References

Orders, decorations, and medals of Sweden
Awards established in 1748